The domain aftermarket is the secondary market for Internet domain names in which a party interested in acquiring a domain that is already registered bids or negotiates a price to effect the transfer of registration from the registered holder of that domain name.

The professional pursuit of speculation in the domain aftermarket is known as domaining. The domain aftermarket has grown substantially, as an increasing number of generic domains names that promise 'marketing appeal' and 'desirability' are registered by domain warehouses, or resellers.

The domain aftermarket is facilitated by auction houses which provide communication methods for buyers and sellers to interact, often anonymously, to negotiate and close a transaction. They often provide additional services, such as financial escrow services and domain parking.

See also 

 Domain Name System
 Domain name speculation

References 

Domain Name System